= 9/6 =

9/6 may refer to:

- September 6 (month-day date notation)
- June 9 (day-month date notation)
